There are several species of reptiles in Cyprus including venomous and non-venomous snakes, lizards and turtles.

Lizards
Family: Agamidae
 Cyprus rock agama, Laudakia cypriaca (Daan, 1967)
Family: Chamaeleontida
 Mediterranean chameleon, Chamaeleo chamaeleon (Linnaeus, 1758)
Family: Gekkonidae
 Kotschy's gecko, Cyrtopodion kotschyi (Steindachner, 1870)
 Mediterranean house gecko, Hemidactylus turcicus (Linnaeus, 1758)
Family: Lacertidae
 Schreiber's fringe-fingered lizard, Acanthodactylus schreiberi (Boettger, 1878)
 Snake-eyed lizard, Ophisops elegans (Ménétriés, 1832)
 Troodos lizard, Phoenicolacerta troodica (Werner, 1936) 
Family: Scincidae
 Bridled mabuya, Mabuya vittata (Olivier, 1804)
 Budak's snake-eyed skink, Ablepharus budaki (Göçmen, Kumlutas & Tosunoglu, 1996) 
 Eyed skink, Chalcides ocellatus (Forsskål, 1775)
 Schneider's skink, Eumeces schneiderii (Daudin, 1802)

Snakes
Family: Colubridae
 Cat snake, Telescopus fallax cyprianus (Barbour & Amaral, 1927)
 Coin snake, Hemorrhois nummifer (Reuss, 1834)
 Cyprus grass snake, Natrix natrix cypriaca (Hecht, 1930)
 Cyprus whip snake, Hierophis cypriensis (Schätti, 1985)
 Dahl's whip snake, Platyceps najadum dahli (Linnaeus, 1758)
 Dwarf snake, Eirenis modestus (Martin, 1838)
 Large whip snake, Dolichophis jugularis (Linnaeus, 1758)
 Montpelier snake, Malpolon monspessulanus insignitus (Geoffroy Saint-Hilaire, 1827)
Family: Typhlopidae
 Worm snake, Typhlops vermicularis (Merrem, 1820)
Family: Viperidae
 Cyprian blunt-nosed viper, Macrovipera lebetina lebetina (Linnaeus, 1758)

Turtles
Family: Cheloniidae
 Loggerhead sea turtle, Caretta caretta (Linnaeus, 1758)
 Green sea turtle, Chelonia mydas (Linnaeus, 1758)
Family: Geoemydidae
 Western Caspian turtle, Mauremys caspica rivulata (Valenciennes, 1833)

See also
Lists of reptiles by region

References

Cox, N. A. & Temple, H. J. (2009). European Red List of Reptiles. Luxembourg: Office for Official Publications of the European Communities

External links 
 The Reptile Database
 www.lacerta.de

 List
Reptiles
Cyprus
Cyprus
Cyprus